Isthmohyla pseudopuma is a species of frog in the family Hylidae.
It is found in Costa Rica and Panama.
Its natural habitats are subtropical or tropical moist montane forests, intermittent freshwater marshes, pastureland, plantations, rural gardens, and heavily degraded former forest.
It is threatened by habitat loss.

References

Pseudopuma
Amphibians described in 1901
Taxa named by Albert Günther
Taxonomy articles created by Polbot